Prislonica is a small town in the municipality of Čačak, Serbia. According to the 2011 census, the town has a population of 1,424 people.

References

Populated places in Moravica District